Ab Zalu-ye Bahram (also Romanized as Āb Zālū-ye Bahrām; also known as Āb Zālū and Āb Zālū-ye Āqā Bahrām) is a village in Jahangiri Rural District, in the Central District of Masjed Soleyman County, Khuzestan Province, Iran. At the 2006 census, its population was 22, in 4 families.

References 

Populated places in Masjed Soleyman County